Sara Mansoor (born 30 January 1988 in Rawalpindi) is a Pakistani tennis player.

Playing for Pakistan at the Fed Cup, Mansoor has a win–loss record of 6–23.

Early life 
Mansoor was born in Rawalpindi and started playing tennis aged 13. Favourite Surface Clay.

Career
In 2011, she along with Sarah Mahboob Khan, Ushna Suhail and Saba Aziz made history as Pakistan re-entered the Fed Cup competition after a decade of absence.

Mansoor ın 2016, Guwahati won South Asian Games Bronze Medalist in singles.

Fed Cup participation

Singles

Doubles

References

External links 
 
 
 

1988 births
Living people
People from Rawalpindi
Pakistani female tennis players
Tennis players at the 2014 Asian Games
Tennis players at the 2018 Asian Games
Asian Games competitors for Pakistan
South Asian Games bronze medalists for Pakistan
South Asian Games medalists in tennis
21st-century Pakistani women